Cedreae or Kedreai, also known as Cedreiae or Kedreiai (Κεδρειαί), was a city of ancient Caria, mentioned by Stephanus of Byzantium Lysander took the place, it being in alliance with the Athenians. The inhabitants were mixobarbaroi (μιχοβάρβαροι), a mixture of Greeks and barbarians. It was a member of the Delian League since it appears in tribute records of Athens between the years 454/3 and 415/4 BCE.
 
Its site is located near Şehir Adaları, Muğla Province, Turkey.

References

Populated places in ancient Caria
Former populated places in Turkey
Members of the Delian League
History of Muğla Province